was a Japanese architect. He graduated from Tokyo University and entered the Ministry of Communications in 1919. He designed many Japanese post offices, telegraph offices, and related buildings in Japan. He introduced Eastern architecture to the west, while incorporating Western architecture in his own designs, including architecture from Scandinavia, Germany, and the United States.

Major works
 Old Kyoto Central Telephone Office, 1926
 Tokyo Central Post Office, 1931
 Osaka Central Post Office, 1939

References

1894 births
1956 deaths
Japanese architects